Farm to Market Road 156 (FM 156) is a farm-to-market road located in North Texas.

Route description
FM 156 begins at an intersection with Bus. US 287 in Fort Worth, near Meacham International Airport. The highway runs in an east-west direction traveling along Terminal Road, before turning north onto Blue Mound Road. After crossing I-820, FM 156 enters into the southeastern section of Saginaw. The highway briefly enters into the town of Blue Mound, before re-entering Saginaw. The highway runs back into Fort Worth, passing by the Bureau of Printing and Engraving, before intersecting US 81/US 287. North of US 81/287 FM 156 runs through sparsely populated areas of the city's northwest area. At School House Road, the highway loops around a rail line and enters Haslet. 

Leaving Haslet, FM 156 turns to the east, passing a few miles to the west of Alliance Airport. The highway briefly enters Fort Worth again, interchanging with SH 114 near Texas Motor Speedway. Leaving Fort Worth, the highway runs through unincorporated areas of Denton County before entering Justin. Just outside Justin, FM 156 briefly runs through the western area of Northlake. The highway runs through the towns of Ponder and Krum before ending at I-35 in southern Sanger.

History
FM 156 originally ran from US 81/287 to SH 114, first opening in April 1945. A few months later, the highway was extended further north through Justin, Ponder and Krum. In 1949 the highway was further extended north to US 77 south of Sanger. The highway was rerouted around Haslet in 1991, with the old highway being turned over to the city. In 1995, the section of highway south of US 81/287 was re-designated as Urban Route 156 (UR 156) by the Texas Department of Transportation. The designation reverted to FM 156 with the elimination of the Urban Road system on November 15, 2018.

Several miles of the highway near Alliance Airport were realigned between 2003 and 2018 as part of a $260 million runway extension project to allow heavily loaded cargo aircraft to take off in hot summer weather and reach Europe unrefueled.

Junction list

References

0156
Transportation in Tarrant County, Texas
Transportation in Denton County, Texas